Arjun (also Romanized as Ārjūn; also known as Ārjān) is a village in Jolgeh Rural District, in the Central District of Golpayegan County, Isfahan Province, Iran. At the 2006 census, its population was 268, in 76 families.

References 

Populated places in Golpayegan County